The men's 70 kg event in bodybuilding at the 2005 World Games in Duisburg was played from 16 to 17 July. The bodybuilding competition took place in TAM Theatre.

Competition format
A total of 8 athletes entered the competition. The best five athletes from round 1 advances to the final rounds. Scores from round 1 doesn't count in final rounds.

Results

References

External links
 Results on IWGA website

Bodybuilding at the 2005 World Games